Bookworm was a British humoristic comic strip, first published on 22 April 1978 in the magazine Whoopee! and survived Whoopee!'''s merger with Whizzer and Chips'' in 1985, becoming a Chip-ite. It was drawn by Sid Burgon for most of its history, although Barry Glennard drew a substantial number of episodes.

Concept
The comic strip centers around a young boy, "Bookworm", who indeed is a huge bibliophile. He is never seen without a book and his parents often try to force him doing more "boyish" things, like playing football. The results are typically disastrous.

References

British comic strips
1978 comics debuts
Comics characters introduced in 1978
1985 comics endings
Child characters in comics
Humor comics
British comics characters